The Faraya-Chabrouh Dam is a dam  above the village of Faraya Lebanon, 40 kilometers northeast of Beirut that was inaugurated in 2007. The dam has a height of 63 metres. The reservoir has a capacity of some 8 million cubic meters and is some 1300 metres in length. 

The dam is located in rural Lebanon and is surrounded by farmland. Agricultural lands stretch far below the Faraya-Chabrouh Dam and the water is used from the reservoir to irrigate the lands, providing an essential resource to thousands of people in the villages below.

Structure
Chabrouh dam is located on Wadi Chabrouh river in Faraya, about 40 km north-east of Beirut. This project will provide potable water during the summer for Kesrouan region (around 250,000 inhabitants). The dam is a bituminous face rockfill dam (BFRD), with maximum height of 65m, crest length of 470m at 1618m above sea level and a volume of rockfill of 1,500,000 m3. The upstream and downstream slopes are 1V:1.7H. The upstream bituminous slab has a total area of 37,000 m2 and total thickness of 22 cm (2 layers of 6 cm and a base of 10 cm).
The embankment is divided into eight zones of materials as well as filters and drains. The rockfill for the embankment is selected from two quarries at about 5 km from the dam site. Zone I (1800–1860) is a mixture of hard limestone (above 1840) and chalky limestone (Average Los Angeles 50) used for embankment material 3B and 3BE (see figure 2.2). Zone II is a formation of very hard limestone (Average Los Angeles 25) used for concrete aggregates and materials 2A, 2B, 3A, 4 and draining systems (see figure 2.3).                                                                                         
The test layers performed with fill material 3B, showed that after compaction, the percentage of fines was greater than expected with  Kh/Kv =100. These results led to the implementation of a draining chimney located at 45 m from the upstream face of the embankment, aiming at controlling all potential leakages, and channelling the water towards the horizontal drains of the embankment.
The construction of the dam was done in phases taking into consideration the fact that the site was covered with snow during at least 4 months of the year. The deviation of the water course was delayed in order to finish the deviation tunnel. Meanwhile, the works were taking place on the left and right banks separately

Description

The project consists of the construction of the three following elements:

The dam (lot 1)

The site is located 40 km north-east of Beirut. Chabrouh is a face concrete rockfill dam having the following specifications:

Storage capacity: 9 million cubic metres
Crest level: 1618 m
Crest length: 470 m
Crest width: 10 m
Maximum height: 63 m
Maximum width: 200 m
Upstream slope: 1.7/1
Downstream slope: 1.7/1
High water level: 1615 
Rockfill volume: 1,550,000 m3
Total volume of excavation in open air: 710,000 m3
Total volume of underground excavation: 28,000 m3
Concrete face area: 30,750 m2
Concrete face thickness: 40 cm
Underground concrete: 12,400 m3
Shotcrete: 3,000 m3
Total grouting holes length  : 60,000 m ( maximum hole depth is 90 m)
Total length of drainage gallery : 500 m

The floodwater structure consists of a well of 11.2 m diameter and 50 m height arising at 1615 m and a  tunnel of 4.5 m diameter and 410 m length ending by a spillway.

The outlet structure consists of a well of 7.20 m diameter and 50 m height arising at 1618 m, a D shaped tunnel of 3 m height and 145 m length and an adduction line of 800 mm diameter and 480 m length with four butterfly valves DN 700.

Adduction line (lot 2)

It consists of 5190 m of pipes of 1000 mm diameter from Nabaa El Laban to Chabrouh reservoir. It passes through a well of 2.7  diameter and 60 m height, and a tunnel of 660 m length (D shape 3 m height).

Water treatment plant (lot 3)

It consists of a drinking water treatment plant of 60,000 m3/day of capacity including water aeration system, treatment chain, treated water reservoir and administrative buildings.

External links

Wikimapia map
Images

Dams in Lebanon
Dams completed in 2007
Concrete-face rock-fill dams